The Pacific Coast Collaborative is an international governmental agency formed on June 30, 2008, including the governments of British Columbia, Washington, Oregon and California.

The Collaborative elected to study a high-speed rail corridor between metropolitan areas in the member states. California High-Speed Rail Authority has begun construction of their state's high-speed rail system, while the governments of Washington and British Columbia plan to conduct a high-speed rail study for the Pacific Northwest Corridor in 2018.

Other regional issues taken up by the group include environmental protection, the opioid crisis, and food waste.

References

External links

Intergovernmental organizations